Plagiolepis pygmaea is a species of ant in the genus Plagiolepis. The species is widely distributed, from Portugal and the Canary Islands in the west, eastwards to Iran, Germany in the north and the Arabian peninsula in the south.

Subspecies
P. p. bulawayensis Arnold, 1922
P. p. mima Arnold, 1922
P. p.  minu Forel, 1911

References

External links

Formicinae
Hymenoptera of Europe
Hymenoptera of Asia
Insects described in 1798